The second season of Bates Motel consisted of 10 episodes and broadcast on A&E from March 3-May 5, 2014, airing on Mondays at 9 p.m. ET/PT. The series itself is described as a "contemporary prequel" to the 1960 film Psycho and follows the life of Norman Bates and his mother Norma in the fictional town of White Pine Bay, Oregon prior to the events portrayed in the Hitchcock film. 

The season received positive reviews from television critics, and the premiere episode drew in a total of 3.07 million viewers. Bates Motel was renewed for a third season after five episodes of the second season had aired. For her performance as Norma Louise Bates, Vera Farmiga received nominations for the 2014 Critics' Choice Television Award for Best Actress in a Drama Series and the 2014 Saturn Award for Best Actress on Television. The season was released on Blu-ray and DVD on October 7, 2014.

Cast and characters

Main

 Vera Farmiga as Norma Louise Bates
 Freddie Highmore as Norman Bates
 Max Thieriot as Dylan Massett
 Olivia Cooke as Emma Decody
 Nicola Peltz as Bradley Martin
 Nestor Carbonell as Sheriff Alex Romero

Recurring
 Michael O'Neill as Nick Ford
 Michael Eklund as Zane Morgan
 Ian Tracey as Remo Wallace
 Paloma Kwiatkowski as Cody Brennan
 Michael Vartan as George Heldens
 Rebecca Creskoff as Christine Heldens
 Kathleen Robertson as Jodi Morgan
 Keenan Tracey as Gunner
 Kenny Johnson as Caleb Calhoun
 Matthew Mandzij as Deputy Jeffcoat
 Michael Rogers as Jimmy Brennan
 Francis X. McCarthy as Declan Rogers
 Agam Darshi as Deputy Patty Lin
 Aliyah O'Brien as Regina

Guest
 Robert Moloney as Lee Berman
 Vincent Gale as Gil Turner
 Gillian Barber as Dr. Helen Ginsberg
 Richard Harmon as Richard Sylmore
 Lini Evans as Amelia Martin
 Brendan Fletcher as Kyle Miller
 Veena Sood as Dr. Elizabeth J. Schaefer
 Sarah Grey as Young Norma
 Andrew Airlie as Mayor Rob Woodriff
 John Cassini as Max Borowitz
 Keegan Connor Tracy as Miss Blaire Watson

Production

Casting
For the second season, Nestor Carbonell, who recurred as Sheriff Alex Romero throughout the first season, was upgraded to a series regular. Beginning in July 2013, Michael Vartan was cast in the recurring role of George Heldens, a 40-something divorcée and love interest for Norma. Kenny Johnson joined the recurring cast as Norma's estranged brother Caleb Calhoun, and Rebecca Creskoff was cast as Christine Heldens, a White Pine Bay society woman and George's sister, who befriends Norma. Michael Eklund was cast as Zane Morgan, an upper level player in the drug business. In August, Kathleen Robertson was cast to recur as Jodi Morgan, Zane's sister, first described as "a smart, sexy businesswoman". Michael O'Neill joined the cast as Nick Ford, the season's major villain.

Filming
At the beginning of the first season, a replica of the original Bates Motel set from the film Psycho was built on location in Aldergrove, British Columbia on 272nd Street, where the series is filmed. Principal photography for the second season began on July 24, 2013. Production at the series' Aldergrove set concluded on November 6, with only location filming left to be completed for the season. During an interview in March 2014, Highmore and Thieriot revealed that the fight scene between Norman and Dylan left both actors in need of medical attention: "I cut my nose. It was nothing, really. Just a little blood", according to Highmore, "but it was real blood, not the fake stuff they put on us. Freddie and I just laughed about it", as Thieriot explained.

Episodes

Reception

Critical response
The second season of Bates Motel received mostly positive reviews. It received 67 out of 100 from Metacritic, based on 11 television critic reviews, indicating "generally favorable reviews". Review aggregator Rotten Tomatoes reported that 19 out of 21 critics gave the second season a positive review, averaging a 90% rating. The site's consensus reads, "Bates Motel reinvents a classic thriller with believable performances and distinguished writing". A&E renewed the series for a third season in April 2014 following the positive reviews and good ratings after the first five episodes.

Ratings
The season premiere episode drew in a total of 3.07 million viewers, with 1.3 million tuning in from the coveted 18–49 demographic. The season finale episode drew in 2.30 million viewers, with 0.9 million watching in the 18–49 demographic. Overall, the second season averaged 2.30 million viewers, with a 0.9 ratings share in the 18–49 demographic.

Awards and nominations

In its second season, Bates Motel was nominated for 16 awards, winning none.

References

External links
 
 

2014 American television seasons
Season 2